Wasabi Technologies, Inc. is an American object storage service provider based in Boston, Massachusetts that sells one product, an object storage service called Wasabi Hot Cloud Storage. The company was co-founded in September 2015 by David Friend and Jeff Flowers and launched its cloud storage product in May 2017. 

Friend, who is CEO of the company, claims that the software "manages how data center hardware stores and organizes information," resulting in high-speed reading and writing of data.

History 
Friend and Flowers were previously co-founders of Carbonite, an online backup service, among other companies. Friend also previously launched ARP Instruments, Computer Pictures, Pilot Software, and Faxnet. 

The company was initially called "BlueArchive" at its founding, but was later renamed to "Wasabi Technologies, Inc." after hot Japanese horseradish.

Wasabi Technologies, Inc. was launched with a single data center location in Ashburn, Virginia, a limitation that generated concern in the online tech forum, Hacker News.

On January 30, 2018, Frost & Sullivan gave Wasabi Technologies, Inc, the 2017 North American Technology Innovation Award.

On March 20, 2018, the company announced a satellite-based cloud storage system, collaborating with SpaceBelt to use satellites as data centers. 

On June 28, 2018, Chris Fenton (former President and General Manager of DMG Entertainment) joined the advisory board. Wasabi also launched its new data center in Hillsboro, Oregon.

In October 2018, the company announced plans to open its first European data center in the Netherlands.

On March 5, 2019, the company announced that its third data center, the first one located in Europe, opened in Amsterdam, Netherlands. 

On April 2nd, 2019, Wasabi launched its partner network, a volume-based incentive program. 

In September 2019, Wasabi Technologies announced it had received an investment of an undisclosed amount from NTT DOCOMO Ventures. The companies also made a joint announcement of the availability of Wasabi hot cloud storage as part of its Enterprise Cloud service, which became available in the US, EMEA and APAC regions. In October 2019, the company announced the launch of its fourth data center in Virginia.

On November 4th, 2021, Wasabi Technologies signed on as sponsor for the Fenway Bowl.

In March 2022, the company signed a multi-year deal with the Boston Bruins and TD Garden and became their Official Cloud Storage Partner. In June of that same year they also secured the naming rights of the NESN studio at Fenway Park.

In 2022, Wasabi Technologies established partnerships with Scale Commuting, Axis Communication, and Hivelocity.

In September 2022, the company reached unicorn status when it raised $250 million in a Series D round of funding.

Funding 
 September 2018: Wasabi Technologies, Inc. raised $68 million
 October 2019: Wasabi Technologies, Inc. received an investment for an undisclosed amount from NTT DOCOMO Ventures.
 May 2020: Wasabi Technologies, Inc. raised $30 million
 October 2022: Wasabi Technologies, Inc. raised $250 million

References

External links 
 

Cloud storage
File hosting
Online backup services
Object storage
Technology companies based in the Boston area
Technology companies established in 2017
Technology companies of the United States